Nothing, Forever is an American interactive procedurally generated animated sitcom broadcast as a livestream. It was created by American digital art collective Mismatch Media, led by developers Skyler Hartle and Brian Habersberger. Originally started as a direct parody of the American sitcom Seinfeld, the livestream broadcasts permutations of 3D computer animated sequences in a kitschy retro low-resolution style, where characters perform AI-generated scripts using voices generated through speech synthesis. The first season continuously ran on Twitch from December 14, 2022 until the channel's temporary suspension on February 6, 2023. After the suspension was lifted, the show went on a brief hiatus until the second season debuted on March 8, with a new cast of characters and an original format different from that of Seinfeld.

Nothing, Forever experienced a surge in popularity in February 2023 following media coverage of the show. The show's nonsensical humor, nondescript style and enthusiastic audience activity has received praise.

Conception and format
The concept of Nothing, Forever was envisioned by Skyler Hartle, a product manager at Microsoft Azure, and Brian Habersberger, a polymer physicist, in 2019. The two met over the video game Team Fortress 2. The show takes inspiration from Rabbits, a series of web films created by American filmmaker David Lynch, and the show's original premise was an homage to the American sitcom Seinfeld. Hartle said that the work "originally started its life as this weird, very, off-center kind of nonsensical, surreal art project. But then we kind of worked over the years to bring it to this new place. And then, of course, generative media [...] just kind of took off in a crazy way over the past couple of years". Hartle and Habersberger formed Mismatch Media in 2022, in collaboration with Jakob Broaddus, Zale Bush, Nic Freeman, Edward Garmon, and Stanley Janoski.

The first season's cast of characters included Larry Feinberg, Yvonne Torres, Fred Kastopolous, and Zoltan Kakler, parodies of Jerry Seinfeld, Elaine Benes, George Costanza, and Cosmo Kramer, respectively.

Viewers can interact with the livestream through Twitch's chat function; in contrast to most television shows, the narrative in Nothing, Forever can change depending on the reactions of the viewers. A fictitious 1990s-style TV channel guide with nonsensically generated show names periodically interrupts the show while new scripts of dialogue are generated.

The second season replaces the original cast of characters with Leo Borges, Nick Sterling, Kelly Coffee and Manfred Fredman. Instead of delivering a stand-up comedy routine, the main character, Leo, starts each episode by writing on his personal blog.

Development
Nothing, Forever is procedurally generated. Dialogue is currently generated through GPT-4 (though it has many variants which have been used by Mismatch Media), a language model from OpenAI. Other technologies used include Stable Diffusion, DALL-E, and Azure Cognitive Services. To generate new scenes, an Azure Function written in TypeScript is used. The machine learning models were written in Python using TensorFlow, while the show is rendered using Unity and C#.

To fund the show, Mismatch Media maintains a Patreon; the highest tier allows viewers to request an appearance of a character based on them within the show. Twitch streamer xQc purchased the tier on a livestream.

Suspension
On February 6, 2023, the Twitch channel for Nothing, Forever received a 14-day suspension, with the developers attributing this to an unspecified piece of standup dialogue. In a statement to The Washington Post, Hartle expressed embarrassment about the incident. Twitch did not give a public reason for the suspension, but users in the stream's Discord suspected it to have been due to a transphobic and homophobic joke delivered by the Feinberg character shortly before the suspension. During a stand-up scene, the character said that he was "thinking about" telling routines with offensive jokes, including comparing the state of being transgender to mental illness and references to the gay agenda. The character then observed that "no one's laughing", and abruptly stopped the routine, asking "Where'd everybody go?"

According to Mismatch Media, OpenAI's primary model for GPT-3, Davinci, had been experiencing outages that were disrupting the broadcast. The creators switched over to Curie, a less sophisticated model, which model produced the offensive content. The creators stated that the content moderation tools used for the Davinci model "were not successful with Curie". They stated that they had resolved the issue with Davinci and would not be switching back to Curie as a fallback in the future.

Mismatch Media announced plans to implement additional "guardrails" to prevent inappropriate content, stating that they "feel very strongly that it’s our duty as people in the generative space to do this as safely as possible". They also hoped to eventually introduce ways for the Twitch chat audience to safely interact with the show and shape its contents, as well as planning to create a platform "within the next six to 12 months" that allows others to create similar shows. The stream returned on March 8.

Reception
Nothing, Forever's first season received a mostly positive reception. Ash Parrish of The Verge found the stream nonsensical, yet humorous. Engadgets Will Shanklin was more critical of the show's surrealist humor, comparing the voices of Larry and Fred to the Beavis and Butt-Head character Mr. Van Driessen. The Twitter account for Seinfeld acknowledged the show, tweeting a link to the Twitch channel and referencing George's line about "robot butchers" in the episode "The Stock Tip".

Upon its debut, the second season of Nothing, Forever received a negative response from audiences, who criticized the departure from the Seinfeld-based format. Levi Winslow of Kotaku noted that "the meta-humor that came with parodying Seinfeld is no longer there" and that the new format felt "neutered, or like the show was canceled only to be picked up by an entirely different network."

The livestream has drawn comparisons to Twitch Plays Pokémon, a social experiment livestreamed on Twitch.

References

External links
 Twitch Channel
 
 Mismatch Media

2023 in Internet culture
Algorithmic art
Livestreams
Seinfeld
Surreal comedy
Twitch (service)